The Trumbull Correctional Institution  is a medium-security prison for men located in Leavittsburg, Trumbull County, Ohio and operated by the Ohio Department of Rehabilitation and Correction.  The facility first opened in 1992 and has a population of 1,529 state inmates, with mixed minimum, medium, and close (maximum) security levels.

Notable inmates
Art Schlichter - Former Quarterback for the Ohio State Buckeyes, Incarcerated for gambling related fraud charges.

Daniel Petric - Perpetrator of the murder of Susan Petric and attempted murder of Mark Petric, transferred from Lorain Correctional Institution

Bennie Adams - Convicted of the murder, rape, and kidnapping of Gina Tenney. Originally sentenced to death but was re-sentenced and transferred from Chillicothe Correctional Institution.

References

Prisons in Ohio
Buildings and structures in Trumbull County, Ohio
1992 establishments in Ohio